Kentucky Route 10, also known as KY 10, is a highway maintained by the Kentucky Transportation Cabinet that runs from Alexandria, Kentucky (a suburb of Cincinnati, Ohio) to the Jesse Stuart Memorial Bridge at Lloyd, roughly north of Greenup, Kentucky, where the route continues into Ohio as State Route 253.

Part of its route, from Ribolt to east of Vanceburg in Lewis County, is along Kentucky Route 9. This section of KY 10, along with the section from Vanceburg to U.S. 23 just before the Jesse Stuart Memorial Bridge, is considered part of the AA Highway.

According to Geotab, a telematics company, KY 10 is among the least traveled highways in the state of Kentucky.

Major intersections

References

External links

KentuckyRoads.com KY 10

0010